The Tathāgatagarbha Sūtra is an influential and doctrinally striking Mahāyāna Buddhist scripture which treats of the existence of the "Tathāgatagarbha" (Buddha-Matrix, Buddha-Embryo, lit. "the womb of the thus-come-one") within all sentient creatures. According to the Buddha, all sentient beings are born with buddha-nature and have the potential to become a Buddha. Physical and mental defilements of everyday life act as clouds over this nature and usually prevent this realization. This nature is no less than the indwelling Buddha himself.

History

Origins and development
Anthony Barber associates the development of the Tathāgatagarbha Sūtra with the Mahāsāṃghika sect of Buddhism, and concludes that the Mahāsāṃghikas of the Āndhra region (i.e. the Caitika schools) were responsible for the inception of the Tathāgatagarbha doctrine.

The Tathāgatagarbha Sūtra is considered "the earliest expression of this [the tathāgatagarbha doctrine] and the term tathāgatagarbha itself seems to have been coined in this very sutra." The text is no longer extant in its language of origin, but is preserved in two Tibetan and two Chinese translations.

Translations
Michael Zimmermann discerns two recensions, the shorter recension, translated by Buddhabhadra in 420 CE, and the more extended and detailed recension, extant in the following translations: 
 the Chinese translation of Amoghavajra (middle of 8th century);
 an apocryphal Tibetan translation from Bathang;
 the canonical Tibetan translation (around 800 CE).
Buddhabhadras version was translated into English by Grosnick in 1995 and the Tibetan version was translated by Zimmermann in 2002.

The nine similes
According to Zimmermann, the nine similes "embody the new and central message of the text, embedded in the more or less standard framework consisting of the setting, a passage expounding the merit of propagating the sutra and a story of the past." 
The simile (1) in the first chapter describes a fantastic scene with many buddhas seated in lotus calyxes in the sky, who are not affected by the withering of the flowers. The following eight similes illustrate how the indwelling Buddha in sentient beings is hidden by the negative mental states (kleśas),

Doctrines

Overview
In regard to the Tathāgatagarbha Sūtra and the term Tathāgatagarbha, A. W. Barber writes:

The Tathāgatagarbha Sūtra constitutes one of a number of Tathāgatagarbha or Buddha-nature sutras (including the Mahāyāna Mahāparinirvāṇa Sūtra, the Śrīmālādevī Siṃhanāda Sūtra, the Angulimaliya Sutra, and the Anunatva-Apurnatva-Nirdesa)  which unequivocally declare the reality of an Awakened Essence within each being.

Tathāgatagarbha and ātman
According to some scholars, the Tathāgatagarbha does not represent a substantial self (ātman); rather, it is a positive language expression of emptiness (śūnyatā) and represents the potentiality to realize Buddhahood through Buddhist practices; the intention of the teaching of Tathāgatagarbha is Soteriology rather than theoretical. This interpretation is contentious. Not all scholars share this view. Michael Zimmermann, a specialist on the Tathāgatagarbha Sūtra, writes for instance: "the existence of an eternal, imperishable self, that is, buddhahood, is definitely the basic point of the Tathāgatagarbha Sutra.

Zimmermann also declares that the compilers of the Tathāgatagarbha Sūtra "did not hesitate to attribute an obviously substantialist notion to the buddha-nature of living beings," and notes the total lack of evident interest in this sutra for any ideas of "emptiness" (śūnyatā): "Throughout the whole Tathāgatagarbha Sūtra the term śūnyatā does not even appear once, nor does the general drift of the TGS somehow imply the notion of śūnyatā as its hidden foundation. On the contrary, the sutra uses very positive and substantialist terms to describe the nature of living beings.' Also, writing on the diverse understandings of Tathāgatagarbha doctrine, Jamie Hubbard comments on how some scholars see a tendency towards monism in the Tathāgatagarbha [a tendency which Japanese scholar Matsumoto castigates as non-Buddhist]. Hubbard comments:

Buddhahood is thus taught to be the timeless, virtue-filled Real (although as yet unrecognised as such by the deluded being), present inside the mind of every sentient being from the beginningless beginning. Its disclosure to direct perception, however, depends on inner spiritual purification and purgation of the superficial obscurations which conceal it from view.

See also 
 Brahman
 Dhammakaya Tradition
 Dolpopa Sherab Gyaltsen
 Hongaku
 Kulayarāja Tantra
 Luminous mind

References

Sources

Further reading
 
 Hodge, Stephen  (2009 & 2012)."The Textual Transmission of the Mahayana Mahaparinirvana-sutra", lecture at the University of Hamburg
 King, Sallie, B. (1991). "Buddha Nature", State University of New York Press,

External links
Chinese, Tibetan and English texts of the TGS in the Thesaurus Literaturae Buddhicae, University of Oslo
 Appreciation of the Nirvana Sutra and Tathagatagarbha teachings
"Tathagatagarbha Buddhism": the full text of the "Tathagatagarbha Sutra" plus text of 4 other "tathagatagarbha" sutras

Mahayana sutras
Buddha-nature